The Church of the Holy Communion is an historic stone Episcopal church building located at 116 North Minnesota Avenue St. Peter, Minnesota, United States. Designed by noted ecclesiastical architect Henry Martyn Congdon of New York City in the Gothic Revival style of architecture, it was built in 1869 of Kasota limestone. It features buttresses and a steeply sloping gabled roof with smaller gabled eye-windows on each slope of the roof. On May 19, 1983, the building was added to the National Register of Historic Places.

History
The first Episcopal service in St. Peter was held on October 27, 1854 at the home of St. Peter's founder Captain William Bigelow Dodd and his wife Harriet. Bishop Jackson Kemper officiated at the service which was attended by 37 people.  Mrs. Dodd was instrumental in inviting Bishop Kemper to St. Peter.  A parish was soon established and the first church a wood-frame structure was built in 1855 near where the current stone church stands. The Rev. Ezra Jones was the first rector of the congregation, he was succeeded by Rev. Edward Livermore who was rector at the time the current church was constructed.  The bell from the first church was placed in the tower of the new church and has rung on the death of every American president since Abraham Lincoln.  The bodies of Captain Dodd, his wife Harriet, and two of their children—Willis Gorman Dodd and Harriet Virginia Dodd—lie buried in a grave behind the present church.

Current status
The church is still an active parish in the Episcopal Diocese of Minnesota. Its current rector is the Rev. Dr. Thomas D. Harries.  Rev. Harries will be retiring as of the end of April 2022.

References

External links
 Church of the Holy Communion website

Buildings and structures in Nicollet County, Minnesota
Episcopal church buildings in Minnesota
Gothic Revival church buildings in Minnesota
Churches on the National Register of Historic Places in Minnesota
Churches completed in 1869
Stone churches in Minnesota
19th-century Episcopal church buildings
Limestone churches in the United States
1869 establishments in Minnesota
National Register of Historic Places in Nicollet County, Minnesota